Bani K. Mallick is a Distinguished Professor and Susan M. Arseven `75 Chair in Data Science and Computational Statistics in the Department of Statistics at Texas A&M University in College Station. He is the Director of the Center for Statistical Bioinformatics. Mallick is well known for his contribution to the theory and practice of Bayesian semiparametric methods and uncertainty quantification. Mallick is an elected fellow of American Association for the Advancement of Science, American Statistical Association, Institute of Mathematical Statistics, International Statistical Institute and the Royal Statistical Society. He received the Distinguished research award  from Texas A&M University and the Young Researcher award from the International Indian Statistical Association.

Mallick's areas of research include semiparametric classification and regression, hierarchical spatial modeling, inverse problem, uncertainty quantification and Bioinformatics. He is renowned for his ability to do major collaborative research with scientists from myriad fields beyond his own, including nuclear engineering, petroleum engineering, industrial engineering, traffic mapping. He has coauthored or co-edited six books and more than 200 research publications.

Mallick earned his undergraduate from the Presidency University, Kolkata, MS from the Calcutta University and Ph.D from the University of Connecticut.

Bibliography
Dey, D., Ghosh, S. and Mallick, B. (1999) Bayesian Generalized Linear Model, Marcel Dekker
Denison, D., Holmes, C., Mallick, B. and Smith, AFM (2002) Bayesian nonlinear Classification and Regression, Wiley, London
Denison, D., Hanson, M., Holmes, C., Mallick, B. and Yu, B. (2003) Nonlinear Classification and Regression, Springer Verlag, New York
Mallick, B., Gold, D., and Baladandanayak, V. (2010) Bayesian analysis of gene expression data, Wiley International.
Biegler, L., Ghattas, O., Keyes, D., Mallick, B., Tenorio, L. and Wilcox, K. (2011) Large scale inverse problems and quantification of Uncertainty, Wiley, International
Dey, D., Ghosh, S. and Mallick, B. (2011) Bayesian Modeling issues in Bioinformatics and Biostatistics, chapman and hall.

References

Living people
Indian statisticians
Texas A&M University faculty
University of Connecticut alumni
Fellows of the American Association for the Advancement of Science
Fellows of the American Statistical Association
Fellows of the Institute of Mathematical Statistics
Fellows of the Royal Statistical Society
Elected Members of the International Statistical Institute
Scientists from Kolkata
Year of birth missing (living people)